The Army Publishing Directorate (APD) is the United States Army's centralized publications and forms management organization.

Office symbol
In accordance with Army Regulation (AR) 25–59, ADP's office symbol is SAAA-APD.

Mission 
The Army Publishing Directorate (APD) supports readiness as the Army's centralized publications and forms management organization. APD authenticates, publishes, indexes, and manages Department of the Army publications and forms to ensure that Army policy is current and can be developed or revised quickly. APD also provides content management services, as well as illustrative and design services from in-house visual information specialists who design publication figure illustrations and manage custom 4 color print projects in support of both HQDA and Army-affiliated clientele  .

See also

Administrative Documents
The list below is not all-inclusive. 
 US Army Regulations (AR)
 AR 25-50 Preparing and Managing Correspondence (5/17/2013)
 AR 670-1 Wear and Appearance of Army Uniforms and Insignia (5/25/2017)
 US Army General Orders (AGO)

Doctrine and Training
the list below is not all-inclusive 
 US Army Doctrine Publications (ADP)
 US Army Doctrine Reference Publications (ADRP)

References

External links
 APD's Website
 ADP's Contact Us web page

 
 
United States Army civilians